El Monte High School in El Monte, California, is a public high school of the El Monte Union High School District. It is one of the oldest high schools in the San Gabriel Valley. Founded in 1901, it began operation in a single, upstairs classroom in the old Lexington Avenue Grammar School, with an enrollment of 12-15 students. By 1908, the high school had its own campus and 65 students. Today, enrollment is approximately 2000. Over 80% of students are of Hispanic origin and over 17% are characterized as Asian/Pacific Islander.

Notable alumni
Tom Morgan, Major League Baseball player
Fred Lynn, Major League Baseball player
Doug Griffin, Major league Baseball player
Albie Pearson, Major League Baseball player
Leonard Nathan, poet
Sandra Neilson, Olympic swimming 3-time gold medalist
Bill Shoemaker, horse racing Hall of Fame jockey, did not graduate
Felipe Rodriguez (soccer), retired soccer player
Lance Larson, Olympic swimming gold and silver medalist
William W. Norton, screenwriter
Don Cheto, Mexican American radio and television personality, comedian

References

High schools in Los Angeles County, California
Public high schools in California
El Monte, California
1901 establishments in California
Educational institutions established in 1901